Marguerite Churchill (December 26, 1910 – January 9, 2000) was an American stage and film actress whose career lasted 30 years, from 1922 to 1952. She was John Wayne's first leading lady, in The Big Trail (1930).

Early years 
 
She was the daughter of Edward Paycen Churchill, a producer who owned a chain of theaters, and Marguerite N. Graham. Her father died when she was ten years old. She was educated in New York City at the Professional Children's School and the Theatre Guild Dramatic School.

Career 

Churchill made her first appearance on Broadway on Christmas Day 1922 and was applauded on Broadway as a leading lady when just sixteen years old. An official of Fox Film saw her acting and gave her a contract which shortly afterwards led her to debut on screen in The Diplomats.

Churchill appeared in more than 25 films. She played leading lady to John Wayne in Raoul Walsh's The Big Trail (1930), an early widescreen epic and Wayne's first leading role. She appeared with Wayne the following year in Girls Demand Excitement (1931), with Spencer Tracy and George Raft in Quick Millions (1931), with Will Rogers in Ambassador Bill (1931), with Warner Oland in Charlie Chan Carries On (1931), with George O'Brien in Riders of the Purple Sage (1931), with Charles Farrell in Girl Without a Room (1933), with Ralph Bellamy in The Final Hour (1936), with Boris Karloff in The Walking Dead (1936), and with Edward Van Sloan in Dracula's Daughter (1936).

On Broadway, Churchill performed in And Now Good-bye (1937), Dinner at Eight (1932), The Inside Story (1932), Skidding (1928), The Wild Man of Borneo (1927), House of Shadows (1927), and Why Not? (1922).

Family 
Churchill was married for 15 years to her one-time costar George O'Brien from July 15, 1933, until their divorce in 1948. They had three children, one of whom was novelist Darcy O'Brien, whom she outlived by two years. Her daughter Orin has played double bass for the New York Philharmonic Orchestra since 1966. A third child, Brian, died in infancy in 1934. 

After her divorce from O'Brien, she appeared in one movie and a few television plays. In 1954, she announced her engagement to Peter Ganine, a sculptor. In the "California Marriage Index, 1949–1959", there is a record of marriage and file date of June 5, 1954, for Peter Ganine and Marguerite Churchill.

Later years 
In 1960, she moved to Rome and, in 1970, to Lisbon, Portugal. She came back to the United States in the 1990s to live near her son, Darcy, whom she outlived by two years.

Death 
She died on January 9, 2000, aged 89, from natural causes in Broken Arrow, Oklahoma.

Filmography 

 The Valiant (1929) (co-starred with Paul Muni in his film debut) as Mary Douglas
 Pleasure Crazed (1929) as Nora Westby
 They Had to See Paris (1929) (with Will Rogers) as Opal Peters
 Seven Faces (1929) as Hélène Berthelot
 Harmony at Home (1930) (with Rex Bell) as Louise Haller
 Born Reckless (1930) (with Edmund Lowe) as Rosa Beretti
 Good Intentions (1930) as Helen Rankin
 The Big Trail (1930) (with John Wayne) as Ruth Cameron
 Girls Demand Excitement (1931) (with John Wayne) as Miriam
 Charlie Chan Carries On (1931) (with Warner Oland) as Pamela Potter
 Quick Millions (1931) (with Spencer Tracy and George Raft) as Dorothy Stone
 Riders of the Purple Sage (1931) (with future husband George O'Brien) as Jane Withersteen
 Ambassador Bill (1931) (with Will Rogers) as Queen Vanya
 Forgotten Commandments (1932) as Marya Ossipoff
 Girl Without a Room (1933) (with Charles Farrell and Charlie Ruggles) as Kay Loring
 Without Children (1935) as Sue Cole
 Speed Devils (1935) as Pat Corey
 Man Hunt (1936) as Jane Carpenter
 The Walking Dead (1936) (with Boris Karloff) as Nancy
 Dracula's Daughter (1936) (with Edward Van Sloan) as Janet
 Murder by an Aristocrat (1936) (with Lyle Talbot) as Sally Keating
 The Final Hour (1936) (with Ralph Bellamy) as Flo Russell
 Alibi for Murder (1936) (with William Gargan) as Lois Allen
 Legion of Terror (1936) as Nancy Foster
 Bunco Squad (1950) as Barbara Madison

References

External links 

 
 
 Marguerite Churchill at Virtual History

1910 births
2000 deaths
Actresses from Kansas City, Missouri
American film actresses
American stage actresses
Actresses from New York City
20th-century American actresses